Roberto Karin Kettlun Pesce (born 25 July 1981) is a former footballer who played as a midfielder. Born in Chile, he represented Palestine at international level.

Career
Kettlun has played club football in Chile, Greece and Italy for Universidad Católica, Palestino, Skoda Xanthi, Unión Española, Brindisi, Santegidiese, Teramo, Olympia Agnonese and Virtus Casarano.

He also earned more than 20 caps for Palestine, scoring three goals in FIFA World Cup qualifying.

References

External links
 
 Roberto Kettlun at FootballDatabase.eu 

1981 births
Living people
Footballers from Santiago
Chilean footballers
Chilean people of Palestinian descent
Chilean expatriate footballers
Citizens of the State of Palestine through descent
Palestinian footballers
Palestinian people of Chilean descent
Palestinian expatriate footballers
Palestine international footballers
Club Deportivo Universidad Católica footballers
Club Deportivo Palestino footballers
Xanthi F.C. players
Unión Española footballers
S.S.D. Città di Brindisi players
Santegidiese Calcio S.S.D. players
S.S. Teramo Calcio players
Pol. Olympia Agnonese players
Hilal Al-Quds Club players
Ahli Al-Khaleel players
Chilean Primera División players
Super League Greece players
Serie D players
Eccellenza players
West Bank Premier League players
Chilean expatriate sportspeople in Greece
Chilean expatriate sportspeople in Italy
Expatriate footballers in Greece
Expatriate footballers in Italy
Association football midfielders